The 1945 SMU Mustangs football team was an American football team that represented Southern Methodist University (SMU) as a member of the Southwest Conference (SWC) during the 1945 college football season. In their eighth, non-consecutive season under head coach Matty Bell, the Mustangs compiled a 5–6 record (4–2 against conference opponents) and outscored opponents by a total of 201 to 110. After a stretch in which the team lost six of seven games, SMU finished the season with three consecutive shutout victories over Arkansas (21-0), Baylor (34-0), and TCU (34-0). The team played its home games at Ownby Stadium in the University Park suburb of Dallas.

Three SMU players received first-team honors from the Associated Press (AP) and/or United Press (UP) on the 1945 All-Southwest Conference football team: back Doak Walker (AP-1, UP-1); end Gene Wilson (AP-1, UP-1); and tackle Tom Dean (AP-1, UP-1).

Schedule

References

SMU
SMU Mustangs football seasons
SMU Mustangs football